The Āzādi Sport Complex formerly known as Āryāmehr Sports Complex is the national sports complex of Iran based in Tehran. It is the biggest sports complex in Iran. The massive Azadi Stadium is located within the walls of this complex.  It was designed by Abdol-Aziz Mirza Farmanfarmaian along with the San Francisco office of Skidmore, Owings & Merill, and constructed by Iran's Arme Construction Company.

The complex was initially built for the 1974 Asian Games, with a future Olympic Games bid in mind. A year later it was showcased as Tehran's short-lived bid to host the 1984 Summer Olympics.

Facilities
 Azadi Stadium
 Azadi Velodrome
 Azadi Indoor Stadium
 Azadi Swimming Pool Hall
 Azadi Five Halls Complex
 Azadi Basketball Hall
 Azadi Weightlifting Hall
 Azadi Volleyball Hall
 Azadi Wrestling Hall
 Azadi Women's Hall
 Azadi Shooting Complex
 Azadi Artificial Lake
 Azadi Driving Court
 Azadi Tennis Courts
 Olympic Hotel, Tehran
 Azadi Equestrian Court
 Azadi Karting Court
 Azadi Baseball Court
 Azadi Football Training Pitches

References

External links 
  Azadi Sport Complex

Sports venues completed in 1974
Sports venues in Tehran
Asian Games water polo venues